K-1 World Grand Prix 2012 Final was a kickboxing event promoted by the K-1 promotion. It took place on March 15, 2013 in Zagreb, Croatia. It was the 19th annual K-1 World GP Final and the first K-1 event since the establishment of K-1 Global Holdings Ltd by EMCOM Entertainment. For the first time in history it was held outside Japan.

Results

 Xiangming Liu was replaced with Xie Chuang.
 Taishan was replaced with Frank Muñoz.
 Miran Fabjan was replaced with  Giannis Sofokleus, then Sofokleus with Edmond Paltatzis.
 Makoto Uehara was replaced with Pavel Zhuravlev.
 Ben Edwards was replaced with Badr Hari.

K-1 World Grand Prix 2012 Tournament bracket

1 featured in K-1 World Grand Prix 2012 in Tokyo Final 16.
* Makoto Uehara and Ben Edwards were unable to fight - their places in the Quarter Finals were taken by Pavel Zhuravlev and Badr Hari
** Badr Hari was unable to fight in the Semi Finals due to injury - his place was taken by Reserve Fight winner Dževad Poturak.

See also
List of K-1 events
List of K-1 champions

References

K-1 events
2013 in kickboxing
Kickboxing in Croatia
2013 in Croatian sport
Sports competitions in Zagreb
2010s in Zagreb
March 2013 sports events in Europe